The current Bodie Island Lighthouse (pronounced “body island”) is the third that has stood in this vicinity of Bodie Island on the Outer Banks in North Carolina and was built in 1872. The lighthouse is just south of Nags Head, a few miles before Oregon Inlet. It was renovated from August 2009 to March 2013, and was made climbable by the public. There are 214 steps that spiral to the top. The 170-foot structure is one of only a dozen remaining tall, brick tower lighthouses in the United States — and one of the few with an original first-order Fresnel lens to cast its light.

History 

The preceding Bodie Island lighthouses actually stood south of Oregon Inlet on Pea Island in an area that is now under water due to the southward migration of the inlet. The first was built in 1847 and then abandoned in 1859 due to a poor foundation.
The second, built in 1859, was destroyed in 1861 by retreating Confederate troops who feared it would be used as a Union observation post during the Civil War. The third and current lighthouse, with its original first order Fresnel lens, was completed in 1872. This lighthouse was built further North and further inland on a 15-acre site. In 1932, the Bodie Island Lighthouse became automated (and the light was upgraded to an electric lamp by using oil-fueled electrical generators), and by 1953 it had been transferred into the care of the National Park Service. It remained staffed until 1940, when the lighthouse was fully automated. In 1953, the generators were disconnected and power was supplied from the commercial electric grid.

While some people (including North Carolinians not from the Outer Banks) pronounce the name with a long "o" sound, it is traditionally pronounced as body. Folklore would have you believe it is due to the number of dead sailors washed ashore from wrecked ships along this portion of the East Coast, which has long been known as the "Graveyard of the Atlantic" but that is not true.  The name is actually derived from the original name of the area, which was "Bodie's Island" after the Body family who once owned the land that was a separate barrier island prior to 1811 when Roanoke inlet that separated it from the Currituck Banks to the north closed.  Local gift shops sell maps of the shipwrecks on the ocean floor. An impressive array of ships have been sunk due to storms, shoals, and German U-boats during World War I and World War II. This lighthouse appears in the background of the 1963–1964 Federal Duck Stamp.

After years of raising funds and postponement, work to restore the cast iron and other parts in need of work began on the lighthouse in August 2009. As of March 2010, the outside scaffolding was 100% complete while interior scaffolding was 50% completed. The restoration was stopped in spring 2011 after significant new structural integrity issues were found in many of the main support beams under the balcony. The additional repairs needed were too costly to finish in the original restoration project. In August, 2011 Hurricane Irene blew out some of the newly restored lantern room glass and tore away a protective shroud covering the lantern room. Flooding caused buckling of the floors in the Bodie Island Light Station Double Keepers Quarters. Additional funding was obtained to continue the restoration, which was restarted in 2012 and completed in March 2013.
There was a re-lighting ceremony on April 18, 2013, and the lighthouse was opened for the general public to climb the following day for a fee.

Timeline

Gallery

See also 
Lighthouses in the United States
Currituck Beach Lighthouse – the only other lighthouse in North Carolina that retains an active first-order Fresnel lens
Dongji Island Lighthouse - painted with a similar pattern

References

External links 

The Bodie Island Lighthouse National Park Service
Cape Hatteras National Seashore, Bodie Island Light Station Double Keepers Quarters: Historic Structure Report National Park Service
Bodie Island Light on Federal Duck Stamp
1963–1964 Federal Duck Stamp by Edward J. Bierly. U.S. Fish & Wildlife Service. Retrieved 2008-08-15.

Buildings and structures in Dare County, North Carolina
Lighthouses on the National Register of Historic Places in North Carolina
North Carolina in the American Civil War
Outer Banks
Tourist attractions in Dare County, North Carolina
Cape Hatteras National Seashore
National Register of Historic Places in Dare County, North Carolina
1872 establishments in North Carolina
Historic districts on the National Register of Historic Places in North Carolina